KAZI (88.7 FM) is a listener-supported, non-commercial community radio station in Austin, Texas, United States.  The transmitter site is located in Southwest Austin and the station has studios in Northeast Austin.  It is owned by Austin Community Radio, Inc., a Texas non-profit entity founded April 22, 1975.

History 
John Warfield, PhD (né John Lewis Warfield; 1938–2007), a University of Texas Professor of African-American studies, was the pioneering founder KAZI-FM, a noncommercial radio station aimed at serving the African-American community in Austin. His success came with the help of his wife, Jan (née Jeanette Aycox; 1941–2015), several board members, and a host of volunteers and supporters. KAZI debuted on air August 29, 1982, 2  –  years ago – broadcasting from a studio on Manor Road. Although its mission, before its debut, was to serve African-Americans of Austin, when it finally debuted, its focus had expanded to appeal to Hispanics and a general audience, according to the station's founding manager, Cheryl Anderson Strange (maiden; born 1947). Warfield was the founding President.

The station primarily features an urban contemporary radio format and also plays other styles of music such as R&B, Hip Hop, Gospel, Blues, Soul, Reggae, and Jazz.  In addition, KAZI provides educational programming, community information, and independent news.

See also
List of community radio stations in the United States

Bibliography

Notes

References

External links
  KAZI 88.7 FM, The Voice of Austin
 

AZI
Radio stations established in 1982
Urban contemporary radio stations in the United States
Community radio stations in the United States
1982 establishments in Texas